Opera was an important feature of the Edinburgh International Festival from its inception.

All the early productions were at the King's Theatre,  a variety touring house with a capacity of 1,350 seats, which had hosted the Carl Rosa Opera and the D'Oyly Carte Opera Company. Edinburgh did not have an opera house, and only limited creative resources to originate productions, in a way that was possible at festivals such as Salzburg from the 1960s onwards.

The Glyndebourne Festival Opera was an key partner who brought two productions to the festival each year from 1947 to 1951. In 1952, their place was taken by the Hamburg State Opera who brought six productions that year. However, in 1953, 1954 and 1955 Glyndebourne returned each time with three productions. Hamburg State Opera made their second visit in 1956, this time with five productions.

1947 (two productions)

1948 (two productions)

1949 (two productions)

1950 (two productions)

1951 (two productions)

1952 (six productions)

1953 (three productions)

1954 (three productions)

1955 (three productions)

1956 (four productions)

See also
Edinburgh International Festival
Opera at the Edinburgh International Festival: history and repertoire, 1957–1966
Opera at the Edinburgh International Festival: history and repertoire, 1967–1976
Drama at the Edinburgh International Festival: history and repertoire, 1947–1956
Drama at the Edinburgh International Festival: history and repertoire, 1957–1966
Ballet at the Edinburgh International Festival: history and repertoire, 1947–1956
Ballet at the Edinburgh International Festival: history and repertoire, 1957–1966
Ballet at the Edinburgh International Festival: history and repertoire, 1967–1976
Musicians at the Edinburgh International Festival, 1947 to 1956
Musicians at the Edinburgh International Festival, 1957–1966
Visual Arts at the Edinburgh International Festival, 1947–1976
World premieres at the Edinburgh International Festival
Edinburgh Festival Fringe
List of Edinburgh festivals
List of opera festivals

References

Edinburgh Festival
Classical music festivals in Scotland
Opera festivals
Opera in Scotland
Annual events in Edinburgh
Opera-related lists
1947 music festivals
1948 music festivals
1949 music festivals
1950 music festivals
1951 music festivals
1952 music festivals
1953 music festivals
1954 music festivals
1955 music festivals
1956 music festivals